Abhishek Singh may mean:
 Abhishek Singh (politician) (born 1981), Indian politician
 Abhishek Singh (cricketer) (born 1984), Indian cricketer 
 Abhishek Singh (artist) (born 1982), Indian visual artist and graphic novelist